Amangeldi Taspihov, Chairman of the West Kazakhstan Region's Trade Unions and former MP of Mazhilis was nominated by the Federation of Trade Unions of Kazakhstan (QRKF) to be the presidential candidate on 24 April 2019. On 4 May 2019, Taspihov became registered candidate by the Central Election Commission after gathering about 120,000 signatures. On 13 May, Taspihov's campaign published their own electoral platforms.

Programs 

 Strengthening the responsibility of unfair employers
 Safe working conditions
 Ensuring labor rights of employees
 Decent living wages
 Regulation of labor migration

Campaign 
Throughout the campaign, Taspihov's campaign emphasized on protecting the rights and interests of working Kazakhstanis.

On 27 May 2019, he proposed amendments to the labor code, saying “these are people who received education, were born here, became specialists. When there should be a return for their homeland, they are forced to leave for other countries, as they are in demand in other countries, they do not receive a decent salary - this is a big problem, I think this problem can be solved. This issue should be dealt with especially by local executive bodies, akims in order to create better conditions in rural areas, create jobs."

During the presidential debates, Taspihov talked about being from large family and didn't attend rallies but worked and wasn't a life-long Mazhilis MP.

Results 
Results of the 2019 presidential election

References 

2019 Kazakh presidential election
2019 Kazakh presidential campaigns
Taspihov